Keuky Lim (born March 7, 1937) is a Cambodian former politician and physician who served as Minister for Foreign Affairs of the Khmer Republic from 1973 to 1975. Presently, he is the President of the Cambodian Diabetes Association which is dedicated to diagnosis, treatment, and self-management for Cambodians living with diabetes.

References

1937 births
20th-century Cambodian politicians
Cambodian anti-communists
Cambodian physicians
Cambodian republicans
Foreign ministers of Cambodia
Government ministers of Cambodia
Khmer Republic
Living people
Paris Descartes University alumni
People from Siem Reap province
Pierre and Marie Curie University alumni
Social Republican Party politicians
University of Texas at Austin alumni